Brooke E. Sheldon was an American librarian and educator who served as the president of the American Library Association from 1983 to 1984.

Career
Born in Lawrence, Massachusetts, Sheldon also grew up in Nova Scotia. She graduated from Cambridge High and Latin School in Cambridge, Massachusetts before returning to Nova Scotia to attend Acadia University as an undergraduate. She earned her master's degree in library science from Simmons College and a doctorate from the University of Pittsburgh. She worked as a librarian at the Detroit Public Library, the Albuquerque Public Library, the Santa Fe Public Library, and at the New Mexico and Alaska state libraries.

Sheldon also worked at several library schools as a faculty member. She worked first as the dean and acting provost of the library school of Texas Woman's University. She later served as dean of the University of Texas at Austin School of Information and as interim director and professor of the University of Arizona School of Information Resources and Library Science. She also taught at the library schools of San Jose State University and the University of Alberta after her formal retirement.

From 1983 to 1984, Sheldon served as the president of the American Library Association, the oldest and largest library association in the world. Over the course of her career, she published several books on librarianship, such as Personnel Administration in the Small Public Library (1980), Leaders in Libraries: Styles and Strategies for Success (1991), and Interpersonal Skills, Theory and Practice: The Librarian's Guide to Becoming a Leader (2010).

On February 11, 2013, Sheldon died from uterine cancer.

Awards
Awards earned by Sheldon include:
Distinguished Alumni Award, Simmons College
Distinguished Alumni Award, University of Pittsburgh
Honorary doctorate, Acadia University
Library Leadership Award, Arizona Library Association
Outstanding Lecturer Award, San Jose State University
Professional Service Award, Association of Library and Information Science Educators

At the University of Texas, she was honored with the establishment of an endowed professorship in her name. Additionally, the New Mexico Library Foundation created a professional development grant named for Sheldon.

References

External links
Faculty profile from San Jose State University

 
 

1931 births
2013 deaths
Acadia University alumni
American librarians
American women librarians
Deaths from cancer in New Mexico
Deaths from uterine cancer
People from Lawrence, Massachusetts
People from Nova Scotia
People from Santa Fe, New Mexico
Presidents of the American Library Association
San Jose State University faculty
Simmons University alumni
Texas Woman's University faculty
Academic staff of the University of Alberta
University of Arizona faculty
University of Pittsburgh alumni
University of Texas at Austin faculty
Cambridge Rindge and Latin School alumni
American women academics
21st-century American women